The name Arlin may refer to:

 Arlin Godwin, American electronic musician and filmmaker
 Arlin Horton, founder of Pensacola Christian College
 Arlin Adams (1921–2015), American judge
 Arlín Ayoví (born 1979), Ecuadorian football player
 Bernard Arlin (born 1942), French field hockey player
 Georg Årlin (1916–1992), Swedish actor
 Georges Arlin(1902–1992), French field hockey player
 Harold Arlin (1895–1986), American engineer and broadcaster
 Steve Arlin (1945–2016), American baseball player